George Hadley (1685–1768) was an English meteorologist.

George Hadley may also refer to:

George Hadley (footballer) (1889–1954), Scottish footballer
George Hadley (orientalist) (died 1798), East India Company officer
George Dickinson Hadley (1908–1984), English gastroenterologist